The Chase-Crowley-Keep House is a historic house located at 305 High Street in Lockport, Niagara County, New York.

Description and history 
It is a stone structure built in 1856 in the Italianate style. A 1903-1905 remodeling was in the Colonial Revival style. It was built for Edward Ithcar Chase, brother of Supreme Court Justice Salmon P. Chase, who was a frequent visitor. In 1967, the property was converted for use by the Lockport Presbyterian Home as a nursing home. It is one of approximately 75 stone residences remaining in the city of Lockport.

It was listed on the National Register of Historic Places on May 21, 2008. It is in the High and Locust Streets Historic District.

References

Houses on the National Register of Historic Places in New York (state)
Italianate architecture in New York (state)
Houses completed in 1856
Houses in Niagara County, New York
National Register of Historic Places in Niagara County, New York
Historic district contributing properties in New York (state)